was a Japanese actor. He was born in Ushigome, Shinjuku, Tokyo. Starting at the Tsukiji Little Theater, Takizawa participated in a number of theatrical troupes before forming Gekidan Mingei with Jūkichi Uno. His was praised for his performance in Death of a Salesman and also directed a version of The Diary of Anne Frank. Perhaps his most notable film role was in Fires on the Plain.

Partial filmography

Film

 Three Sisters With Maiden Hearts (乙女ごころ三人姉妹, Otome-gokoro sannin shimai) (1935)
 A Ball at the Anjo House (安城家の舞踏会, Anjō-ke no butōkai) (1947)
 The Bells of Nagasaki  (長崎の鐘, Nagasaki no Kane) (1950)
 The Tale of Genji (1951)
 Story of a Beloved Wife (1951)
 Children of Hiroshima (1952)
 Epitome (1953)
 Rokunin no ansatsusha (1955) - Sakamoto Ryōma
 Christ in Bronze (1956)
 A Fantastic Tale of Naruto (1957)
 The Loyal 47 Ronin (忠臣蔵 Chūshingura) (1958) - Kira Yoshinaka
 Stolen Desire (盗まれた欲情, Nusumareta yokujo) (1958)
 Fires on the Plain (1959)
 Kiku to Isamu (1959)
 Love Under the Crucifix (1962)
 The Flower and the Angry Waves  (花と怒濤, Hana to dotō) (1964)
 Kiri no Hata (1965)
 Taking The Castle (1965) - Naoe Kanetsugu
 Shiroi Kyotō (1966) - Professor Funao
 The Sands of Kurobe (1968)
 Tempyō no Iraka (1980)
 Rokudenashi Blues '98 (ろくでなしBLUES '98) (1998)

Television
 Akō Rōshi (1964) - Kira Yoshinaka
 Minamoto no Yoshitsune (1966) - Fujiwara no Hidehira
 San Shimai (1967) - Shinbei of the Wind
 Ryōma ga Yuku (1968) - Narrator
 Ten to Chi to (1969) - Nagao Tamekage
 Shin Heike Monogatari (1972) - Emperor Shirakawa and Emperor Go-Shirakawa

Honours
Medal with Purple Ribbon (1977)
Order of the Sacred Treasure, 3rd class, Gold Rays with Neck Ribbon (1986)

References

External links
 

1906 births
2000 deaths
20th-century Japanese male actors
Male actors from Tokyo
Recipients of the Medal with Purple Ribbon